Cianowice Duże  is a village in the administrative district of Gmina Skała, within Kraków County, Lesser Poland Voivodeship, in southern Poland.

The village has a population of 1,107.

There is a manor house in the village, belonging to Dobiecki family, which was returned to the original owner's son, Count Eustache Dobiecki, in August 2003.

References

Villages in Kraków County